Synge is an Irish and British surname. Notable people with the name include:
 Cathleen Synge (born 1923), Canadian mathematician a.k.a. Cathleen Synge Morawetz 
 Edward Synge (archbishop of Tuam) (1659–1741), Anglican clergyman who served in the Church of Ireland
 Edward Synge (bishop of Elphin) (1691–1762), Anglican bishop in the Church of Ireland
 Edward Hutchinson Synge (1890–1957), inventor of the near-field optical microscope
 John Lighton Synge (1897–1995), Irish mathematician and physicist
 John Millington Synge (1871–1909), Irish playwright, poet, and prose writer
Mary Helena Synge (1840-1917) Irish composer
 Nicholas Synge (died 1771), 18th-century Irish Anglican priest
 Patrick Synge (1910–1982), British botanist, writer and plant hunter
 Richard Laurence Millington Synge (1914–1994), British biochemist
 Violet Synge Girl Guide Chief Commissioner for England
 William Synge (1826-1891), British diplomat and writer

See also
Synge (hill), a categorisation of British hills named after Tim Synge